The Empire Award for Scene of the Year was an Empire Award presented annually by the British film magazine Empire to honor the best film scene of the previous year. The Empire Award for Scene of the Year was first introduced at the 8th Empire Awards ceremony in 2003 with "Yoda's duel" from Star Wars: Episode II – Attack of the Clones receiving the award and last presented at the 12th Empire Awards ceremony in 2007 with "The bridge attack" from Mission: Impossible III receiving the award. Winners were voted by the readers of Empire magazine.

Winners and nominees
In the list below, winners are listed first in boldface, followed by the other nominees. The number of the ceremony (1st, 2nd, etc.) appears in parentheses after the awards year, linked to the article (if any) on that ceremony.

2000s

References

External links

Scene